Mikael Saha (born March 5, 1995) is a Finnish ice hockey player. He is currently playing with Kiekko-Vantaa in the Finnish Mestis.

Saha made his Liiga debut playing with Ässät during the 2014–15 Liiga season.

References

External links

1995 births
Living people
Ässät players
Finnish ice hockey forwards
People from Loimaa
Sportspeople from Southwest Finland